"Your Squaw Is on the Warpath" is a song written and originally performed by American country music artist Loretta Lynn. It was released as a single in October 1968 via Decca Records.

Background and reception 
"Your Squaw Is on the Warpath" was recorded at the Bradley's Barn on August 30, 1968. Located in Mount Juliet, Tennessee, the session was produced by renowned country music producer Owen Bradley. Two additional tracks were recorded during this session.

"Your Squaw Is on the Warpath" reached number three on the Billboard Hot Country Singles survey in early 1969. The song became her thirteenth top ten single under the Decca recording label. Additionally, the song peaked at number seventeen on the Canadian RPM Country Songs chart during this same period. It was included on her studio album of the same name (1968).

Track listings 
7" vinyl single
 "Your Squaw Is on the Warpath" – 2:02
 "Let Me Go, You're Hurtin' Me" – 2:35

Charts

Weekly charts

References 

1968 songs
1968 singles
Decca Records singles
Loretta Lynn songs
Songs written by Loretta Lynn
Song recordings produced by Owen Bradley